The Trumpchi M6 and the previous GM6 is a compact MPV manufactured by GAC Group under the Trumpchi brand in China and the GAC Motor brand globally as the GAC GM6 or the GAC GN6. The GM6 name was changed to M6 in 2020 followed by the larger M8 minivan name change.

Overview 

In China, the Trumpchi GM6 is classified as a compact seven-seat MPV, competing with cars like the Buick GL6 and Maxus G50.

The Trumpchi GM6 was launched at the 2018 Beijing Auto Show as Trumpchi's second MPV model following the Trumpchi GM8, and was launched in the Chinese car market in the first quarter of 2019 with prices ranging from around 109,800 to 159,800 yuan. The Trumpchi GM6 is available in either a seven-seat 2/2/3 setup or a six-seat version.

The Trumpchi GM6 is equipped with a 1.5 liter turbo inline-four petrol engine codenamed 4A15J1 producing 171 horsepower (126 kW) and 265N·m. Fuel consumption is 7.3L/100 km and 7.4L/100 km.

Trumpchi M6 rename
A facelift was revealed in September 2020 changing the name of the GM6 in the Chinese market to M6, following the M8. A version featuring a body kit called the Trumpchi M6 Master Edition was also available from November 2020.

Trumpchi M6 Pro
Based on the M6, another facelift was launched during the 2021 Shanghai Autoshow called the M6 Pro, featuring a redesigned front fascia. Powertrain remains unchanged.

See also
 List of GAC vehicles

References

External links 

 
 (Global)

GM6
Minivans
Cars of China
Front-wheel-drive vehicles
Cars introduced in 2018